The year 2021 is the 18th year in the history of the Wu Lin Feng, a Chinese kickboxing promotion. The events are broadcast on Henan Television in mainland China and streamed on Douyin and Xigua Video.

List of events

Wu Lin Feng 2021: Global Kung Fu Festival - Chinese End of Year Show

Wu Lin Feng 2021: Global Kung Fu Festival was a kickboxing event held on January 23, 2021 in Macao, China.

Background
The event features an 8-man one night tournament, the participants were picked via fans votes among 16 candidates. the fighter who received the most votes with over 80,000 was Tie Yinghua.

Results

Wu Lin Feng 2021: World Contender League 1st Stage

Wu Lin Feng 2021: World Contender League 1st Stage is a kickboxing event held on March 27, 2021 in China.

Background
The event was headlined by a 64kg match between Wei Rui and Liu Wei.

The event will feature four matches each in the 60kg, 63kg and 65 kg Contender Leagues.

Results

Wu Lin Feng 2021: World Contender League 2nd Stage

Wu Lin Feng 2021: World Contender League 2nd Stage is a kickboxing event held on April 24, 2021 in Zhengzhou, China.

Background
The event will feature matches each in the 67kg and 70kg World Contender Leagues.

Results

Wu Lin Feng 2021: World Contender League 3rd Stage

Wu Lin Feng 2021: World Contender League 3rd Stage is a kickboxing event held on May 22, 2021 in Xin County, China.

Results

Wu Lin Feng 2021: World Contender League 4th Stage

Wu Lin Feng 2021: World Contender League 4th Stage is a kickboxing event held on May 29, 2021 in Zhengzhou, China.

Background
The event featured matches in the 60, 65 and 67kg Contender Leagues and was headlined by a 65kg match between Liu Xiangming and Thodkui Manas. Zhang Lanpei and Zhang Mengfei both missed weight and entered their respective bouts with a point deduction penalty.

Results

Wu Lin Feng 2021: World Contender League 5th Stage

Wu Ling Feng 2021: 100th Year Anniversary of the Chinese Communitst Party or Wu Lin Feng 520: World Contender League 5th Stage is a kickboxing event held on July 3, 2021 in Zhengzhou, China.

Results

Wu Lin Feng 2021: WLF in Tangshan

Wu Lin Feng 2021: WLF in Tangshan is a kickboxing event held on September 25, 2021 in Tangshan, China. The event was originally scheduled on July 31, 2021 in Tangshan, China. The event was postponed, due to the floods in the Henan province.

Results

Wu Lin Feng 2021: World Contender League 6th Stage

Wu Lin Feng 2021: World Contender League 6th Stage or Wu Lin Feng 522 is a kickboxing event held on September 30, 2021 in Zhengzhou, China.

Results

Wu Lin Feng 2021: WLF on Haihua Island

Wu Lin Feng 2021: WLF on Haihua Island or Wu Lin Feng 523 is a kickboxing event held on October 30, 2021 in Danzhou, China.

Results

Wu Lin Feng 2021: World Contender League 7th Stage

Wu Lin Feng 2021: World Contender League 7th Stage or Wu Lin Feng 525 is a kickboxing event held on November 27, 2021 in Zhengzhou, China.

Results

Wu Lin Feng 2021: WLF 526

Wu Lin Feng 526 is a kickboxing event held on December 16, 2021 in Zhengzhou, China.

Results

See also
 2021 in Glory 
 2021 in K-1
 2021 in ONE Championship
 2021 in Romanian kickboxing

References

2021 in kickboxing
Kickboxing in China